Chewa may refer to:
the Chewa people
the Chewa language